Vladimir de Semir (born 1948 in Barcelona) is Spanish journalist. He started his career in 1975 and has specialized in science journalism and science popularization since 1982. In 1994 he began teaching and training new journalists and popular science writers at Pompeu Fabra University (Spain) where he directs the Science Communication Observatory. In 1994, the Spanish Scientific Research Council awarded de Semir with the Prize for Scientific Journalism "for the extraordinary work carried out by him in 1993 and previous years in the Science and Technology and Medicine and Quality of Life supplements of the La Vanguardia newspaper, and for his contribution to training science journalists at Pompeu Fabra University and his activity in stimulating scientific culture".

Current occupation
Journalist specializing in Scientific and Medical Journalism. Associate Professor of Science Journalism at the Faculty of Communication of Pompeu Fabra University, Barcelona, where he also directs the Science Communication Observatory, a research center specializing in analysis of the transmission of scientific, medical and environmental knowledge to society. Director of the Master’s in Scientific, Medical and Environmental Communication at the Institute of Ongoing Education (IDEC) of Pompeu Fabra University, Barcelona, since 1995 and of the Diploma in Scientific Communication in Buenos Aires (Argentina) since 2008. Member of the executive committee of the international network, Public Communication of Science and Technology, a committee of 25 experts in communication, popularization and outreach, museum studies, research and public perception of science, representing the cultural and scientific sensitivities of all the continents. Member of the expert group Benchmarking the Promotion of RTD culture and Public Understanding of Science. Member of the expert group Monitoring Policy and Research Activities on Science in Society(MASIS)
of the European Commission. Member of the Comité Consultatif de Déontologie et Éhique de l’Institut de Recherche pour le Développement (IRD) Member of the European Science Communication Network (ESConet) and trainer of the European Science Communication Workshops  Director of the journal Quark (Science, Medicine, Society and Culture) Member of the Scientific and Strategic Council of the program Young people within the building of a European knowledge based society, created by the French Presidency of the European Commission and run from the Centre National de Recherche Scientifique (CNRS)and the Association "Les petits débrouillards". Regular columnist in the Spanish science popularization magazine Muy Interesante and in the supplement El Cultural of the Spanish newspaper El Mundo. Member of the Board of Governors of the Foundation Víctor Grífols i Lucas Member of the advisory board of the magazine L’Erol, a cultural magazine of the Berguedà region (Catalonia).

In May 2010, Vladimir de Semir was member of the scientific committee of the Media for Science Forum organised by the Spanish Foundation for Science and Technology with the collaboration of the European Commission in the context of the Spanish Presidency of Europe 2010.

Partial list of publications
Ethics: the essence of scientific and medical communication - Victor Grifols Foundation, 2011
Science Communication & Science Journalism - Fecyt, 2010

References

1948 births
Living people
Spanish journalists
Academic staff of Pompeu Fabra University
People from Barcelona